Byrsophyllum tetrandrum is a species of plant in the family Rubiaceae. It is native to Kerala and Tamil Nadu in India. Its habitat has been damaged from exposure to fires, animal grazing, commercial agriculture and deforestation.

References

tetrandrum
Flora of Kerala
Flora of Tamil Nadu
Endangered plants
Taxonomy articles created by Polbot